James Provan Reid (14 December 1935 – 9 October 2017) was a Scottish footballer who played as an inside forward for clubs including Dundee United, Bury and Stockport County.

Playing career
Born in Dundee, Jimmy Reid played junior football for Dundee St Joseph's. He made his Scottish Football League debut for Dundee United in March 1955, playing as a trialist against Hamilton Academical and then signing for the club immediately afterwards. He was a regular for the next two years until he was transferred to Football League club Bury in January 1957. He then joined Stockport County in March 1959 before returning to Dundee United in August 1959. Three months later he joined East Fife, later going on to play for Arbroath and Brechin City as well as junior teams.

After football
After retiring as a player, Reid opened a shop in the Seagate area of Dundee, which he ran for almost fifty years. He died in a Dundee care home in October 2017 aged 81, having suffered from dementia.

References

External links

1935 births
2017 deaths
Footballers from Dundee
Scottish footballers
Association football inside forwards
Dundee United F.C. players
Bury F.C. players
Stockport County F.C. players
East Fife F.C. players
Arbroath F.C. players
Brechin City F.C. players
Scottish Football League players
English Football League players
Scottish Junior Football Association players